Dolly Caroline Ledwaba is a South African politician who has represented the African National Congress (ANC) in the Gauteng Provincial Legislature since 2019. She formerly represented the ANC as a local councillor in the City of Tshwane Metropolitan Municipality.

Political career 
Ledwaba served three terms in the Tshwane council – one term as a proportional-representation councillor and two terms as a ward councillor for Ward 33 in Soshanguve. In July 2018, she was elected to a four-year term on the Provincial Executive Committee of the ANC's provincial branch in Gauteng. 

The following year, in the 2019 general election, she was elected for the first time to a seat in the Gauteng Provincial Legislature, ranked 28th on the ANC's provincial party list. She was not re-elected to the Provincial Executive Committee in 2022.

Personal life 
Ledwaba's daughter, Lerato Aphane, is a local politician in Tshwane.

References

External links 
 

African National Congress politicians
Living people
Year of birth missing (living people)
Members of the Gauteng Provincial Legislature
21st-century South African politicians